Cemalettinköy (also: Cemalettin) is a village in the Ahlat District of Bitlis Province in Turkey. Its population is 463 (2021).

References

Villages in Ahlat District